Makwane is a village in Thabo Mofutsanyane District Municipality in the Free State province of South Africa.

It is the original hometown of the Free State Stars, which were established in 1977 as the Makwane Computer Stars.

In 2014, Sasol established an Integrated Energy Centre in the Makwane, to provide the community with energy services and other amenities. Makwane consists of metsimatsho, phahameng, comet, molapo sekgutlong, tebang and matshekgeng.

References

Populated places in the Maluti a Phofung Local Municipality